Martin Holst (born 26 August 1978) is a retired Swedish ice hockey player. Holst was part of the Djurgården Swedish champions' team of 2001. Holst made 7 Elitserien appearances for Djurgården.

References

External links

Swedish ice hockey players
Djurgårdens IF Hockey players
1978 births
Living people